NSG is a British afroswing collective from East London. The group consists of Kruddz, OGD, Papii Abz, Dope, Mxjib, and Mojo. They released two mixtapes, Grown Up and Roots, the latter includes their most successful single "Options" featuring Tion Wayne. NSG is acronym that has multiple meanings such as: Nipple Sucking Gang, Non-Stop Grinding, Never Stop Growing, No Sleep Gang, New Sound Group, and Nigeria Slash Ghana.

History
NSG are a collective of childhood friends who grew up in Hackney, London, attending the same high school at Arts and Media School, Islington. Some of the members were students at University of Hertfordshire. The group consists of three artists from Nigerian heritage and three artists from Ghanaian heritage. Two of the members, Kruddz and OGD, are the younger brothers of producer Jae5. OGD is also part of a production team named 4PLAY. 

NSG released their first single "Whine and Kotch" in December 2013, and collaborated with English rapper J Hus in 2015. In 2017, NSG released their debut mixtape, Grown Up. In 2018, they released the single "Options" featuring Tion Wayne. In 2019, it became their first single to reach the UK Singles Chart at number 7. On 19 June 2020, NSG released their second mixtape, Roots. 

On 9 December 2021, they released an EP titled, Headliner, ahead of their Roots Africa Tour.

Members
 Kruddz
 OGD
 Papii
 Dope
 Mxjib
 Mojo
Tag

Discography

Mixtapes

Extended plays

Singles

As lead artist

As featured artist

Other charted songs

Guest appearances

References

Hip hop collectives
English hip hop groups
British contemporary R&B musical groups
Black British musical groups